Schardam is a small village in the Dutch province of North Holland.

The village was first mentioned in 1319 as "den Scaderdam". The etymology is unclear. Schardam is a dike village which developed in the 14th century. There is a double exit sluice in Schardam. The southern sluice dates from 1592 and was renewed in 1738. The northern sluice 1712.

Schardam was home to 91 people in 1840. It was a separate municipality from 1817 to 1854, when it was merged with Beets. In 2016, it became part of the municipality of Edam-Volendam.

Gallery

References

Former municipalities of North Holland
Populated places in North Holland
Geography of Edam-Volendam